is a Japanese baseball player. He has been with the Fukuoka SoftBank Hawks since 1999, and plays as pitcher, wearing number 16.

External links 
 Official profile on Hawks website 

1980 births
Living people
Baseball people from Fukuoka (city)
Japanese baseball players
Nippon Professional Baseball pitchers
Fukuoka Daiei Hawks players
Fukuoka SoftBank Hawks players